Pesakh "Paul" Novick (7 September 1891 – 21 August 1989) was a radical Jewish-American journalist, political commentator, and editor. Novick is best remembered as the long time editor-in-chief of the Communist Party Yiddish-language daily Morgen Freiheit (Morning Freedom) and of the Communist-affiliated English-language magazine Jewish Life. Novick was expelled from the Communist Party in 1972 for challenging Soviet foreign policy (specifically as it pertained to Czechoslovakia, Afghanistan, and Israel), and for openly supporting Zionism.

Biography

Early years

Pesakh Novick, better known as Paul Novick, was born in 1891 in Brest-Litovsk, Russian Empire (today Belarus).

In 1920 he emigrated to the United States, to which he gained citizenship in 1927.

Political career

In 1953, during the height of the Second Red Scare, the United States Department of Justice announced that it would attempt to strip Novick of his naturalized American citizenship and to have him deported on the grounds that he swore to false statements during his 1927 citizenship proceedings.

Expulsion
Novick had repeatedly come under fire for going against Communist Party policy. In 1967, Novick asserted that Israel was "acting in self-defence" in its aggression against Egypt during the Six-Day War, and was the only dissenting vote against publishing a statement of support for Soviet-backed Egypt. When the Communist Party of Israel (Maki) split in the mid-1960s, and the Communist Party USA supported the anti-Zionist Rakah faction, Novick aligned himself with the opposing Mikunis-led faction. Novick was also accused by CPUSA members Hyman Lumer, Claude Lightfoot, and Jose Ristorucci of signing petitions that countered Party policy, and of openly proclaiming himself a Zionist in both his personal life and in editorials for the Morgen Freiheit. Novick was expelled from the CPUSA in 1972, following further accusations of anti-Black racism and nationalism.

Death and legacy
Novick died, aged 97, of congestive heart failure and kidney deficiency at a hospital in Peekskill, New York.

Novick's wife, Shirley Novick, was the subject of Red Shirley, a short documentary film produced in 2011 by New York City rock icon Lou Reed.

References

Works

 "Decay of the Socialist Party," New Masses, July 10, 1934, pp. 8–11.
 "The Rise and Fall of Abraham Cahan," New Masses, Aug. 20, 1935, pp. 9–10.
 "The Socialist Housecleaning," New Masses, Sept. 7, 1937, pp. 15–16.
 "Peace by Understanding: A Communist Rejects the Partition of Palestine," New Masses, Aug. 9, 1938, pp. 8–10.
 "A Solution for Palestine," The Communist, Sept. 1938, pp. 785–796.

Further reading

 Gennady Estraikh, "Professing Leninist Yiddishkayt: The Decline of American Yiddish Communism," American Jewish History, vol. 96, no. 1 (March 2010), pp. 33–60. In JSTOR
 Peter B. Flynt, "Paul Novick is Dead; Editor, 97, Helped Start Yiddish Daily," New York Times, Aug. 22, 1989.
 Matthew Hoffman, "The Red Divide: The Conflict between Communists and their Opponents in the American Yiddish Press," American Jewish History, vol. 96, no. 1 (March 2010), pp. 1–31. In JSTOR

External links
 Daniel Soyer and Shloyme Krystal (eds.), "Guide to the Papers of Paul (Pesakh) Novick (1891-1989) 1897-1991, 2006 (bulk 1940-1988),"  YIVO Institute for Jewish Research, Center for Jewish History, New York, 2011.
 Communist Party, USA section of Jews, Marxism and the Worker’s Movement at marxists.org, containing many articles by Paul Novick

1891 births
1989 deaths
American male journalists
American Zionists
Belarusian Jews
Communist Party USA politicians
Jewish American journalists
Jewish socialists
Jews from the Russian Empire
Labor Zionists
Writers from Brest, Belarus
People from Brestsky Uyezd